Dulichius is a genus of bugs in the family Alydidae and tribe Micrelytrini.  It is notable for species which are ant mimics.

Species 
The Coreoidea Species File lists:
 Dulichius baptisti Fernando, 1957
 Dulichius concolor Bergroth, 1912
 Dulichius cruszi Fernando, 1957
 Dulichius culani Fernando, 1957
 Dulichius gemellus Haglund, 1895
 Dulichius inflatus (Kirby, 1891)
 Dulichius katangensis Schouteden, 1913
 Dulichius macrocephalus Villiers, 1950
 Dulichius similis Linnavuori, 1987
 Dulichius sinhaladvipa Fernando, 1957
 Dulichius tambapanni Fernando, 1957
 Dulichius tanamalwila Fernando, 1957
 Dulichius thompsoni Distant, 1903
 Dulichius trispinosus Stål, 1866 - type species

References

External links

Hemiptera of Asia
Alydidae
Hemiptera genera